Marko Ičelić (born 20 January 1979) is a Serbian professional basketball coach for Leotar of the Bosnia and Herzegovina Championship.

Coaching career 
Ičelić started his coaching career at OKK Beograd as a coach for youth selections. In 2004, he was promoted to an assistant coach. In the first two seasons he was assistant to Dejan Mijatović, while in the 2006–07 season, he assisted Slobodan Nikolić.

Prior to the 2007–08 season, Ičelić became a head coach for OKK Beograd of the Basketball League of Serbia B. In the next season, his team finished second and got promoted to the Basketball League of Serbia. In the mid-season of the 2011–12 BLS season, he parted ways with OKK Beograd.

Prior to the 2012–13 BLS season, Ičelić was named a head coach for Radnički Belgrade. In February 2013, Radnički parted ways with him. In the 2013–14 season, Ičelić coached Leotar of the Championship of Bosnia and Herzegovina. In summer 2014, he became a head coached for Kožuv of the Macedonian First League. In January 2015, Ičelić parted ways with Kožuv.

In the 2015–16 season, Ičelić was a head coach for Al Jazira SC of the UAE National League. In the 2016–17 season, Ičelić was a head coach for Klik Arilje that won the 3rd-tier First Regional League of Serbia – West Division. In the 2017–18 season, Ičelić was a head coach for Al Sharjah of the UAE National League.

In summer 2018, Ičelić became a head coach for Al Jazira SC for the second time. In August 2021, Leotar named him as their new head coach.

National team coaching career 
Ičelić was an assistant coach of the Serbia U20 national team at the 2010 FIBA Europe Under-20 Championship in Croatia and at the 2013 FIBA Europe Under-20 Championship in Estonia.

Ičelić was the head coach of the Serbia U18 national team that won the silver medal at the 2011 FIBA Europe Under-18 Championship in Poland. His team lost to Spain in the final game, 71–65.

Ičelić was the head coach for the Serbia U16 national team that won the bronze medal at the 2012 FIBA Europe Under-16 Championship in Latvia and Lithuania.

References

External links 
 
 Marko Icelic at asia-basket.com

1979 births
Living people
BKK Radnički coaches
KK Klik Arilje coaches
KK Leotar coaches
OKK Beograd coaches
People from Požega, Serbia
Serbian expatriate basketball people in Bosnia and Herzegovina
Serbian expatriate basketball people in North Macedonia
Serbian expatriate basketball people in the United Arab Emirates
Serbian men's basketball coaches